Tim van Dijke (born 15 March 2000) is a Dutch professional racing cyclist, who currently rides for UCI WorldTeam .

Major results

2019
 1st Ronde van Oud-Vossemeer
2020
 3rd Overall Tour Bitwa Warszawska 1920
2021
 1st Stage 6 CRO Race
 National Under–23 Road Championships
1st  Road race
2nd Time trial
 2nd Ster van Zwolle
 6th Coppa della Pace
 7th Overall Kreiz Breizh Elites
1st Stage 1 (TTT)
 9th Overall Flanders Tomorrow Tour
2022
 1st Prologue (TTT) Tour de l'Avenir
 1st Prologue Sibiu Cycling Tour
2023
 2nd Grand Prix de Denain

References

External links

2000 births
Living people
Dutch twins
Twin sportspeople
Dutch male cyclists
Sportspeople from Goes
Cyclo-cross cyclists
Cyclists from Zeeland